Inner Child is the second studio album by American R&B singer-songwriter Shanice, released November 19, 1991, on Motown Records. The album peaked at number 13 on Billboard'''s Top R&B Albums chart.

The lead single "I Love Your Smile" peaked at number two on the US Billboard Hot 100 and number one on the R&B charts. The album also features a remake of Minnie Riperton's 1974 hit "Lovin' You" which hit number 59 on the R&B Singles chart in the summer of 1992. Shanice would cover the song for a second time on her 2006 album Every Woman Dreams''.

Her other two singles, "I'm Cryin''" and her duet with Johnny Gill, "Silent Prayer", also proved to be successful on the R&B charts. The album was certified Gold making it Shanice's most successful album.

The UK version of the album features the Driza Bone remix of "I Love Your Smile" as track 14.

Track listing
 "Keep Your Inner Child Alive" (interlude)  – 1:24 (Sally Jo Dakota, Narada Michael Walden)
 "I Love Your Smile"  – 4:19 (Walden, Jarvis La Rue Baker, Shanice, Sylvester Jackson)
 "Forever In Your Love"  – 4:46 (Baker, Dakota, Walden)
 "I'm Cryin'"  – 5:07 (Dakota, Walden, Shanice)
 "I Hate To Be Lonely"  – 6:46 (Walden, Wilson, Louis Biancaniello)
 "Stop Cheatin' On Me"  – 4:50 (Baker, Walden, Shanice, Sandy Griffith, Claytoven Richardson)
 "Silent Prayer" (duet with Johnny Gill) – 5:03 (Walden, Jeffrey Cohen)
 "Peace in the World"  – 4:26 (Baker, Dakota, Walden, Shanice)
 "Lovin' You"  – 3:57 (Minnie Riperton, Richard Rudolph)
 "You Ain't All That"  – 4:36 (Walden, Shanice, Biancaniello, Mike Mani, Hathaway Pogue)
 "Shanice & Mookie Meet Homie" (interlude)  – 0:23 (Walden, Janice Wilson)
 "You Didn't Think I'd Come Back This Hard"  – 3:39 (Baker, Shanice, Mani, Eric Daniels)
 "You Were The One"  – 5:21 (Shanice, Crystal Wilson, Daryl Duncan, Kataya Anderson)
 "I Love Your Smile" (Hakeem's Mix)  – 4:16 (Abdulsamad, Walden, Baker, Shanice, S. Jackson)
 "Goodnight" (interlude)  – 0:23 (Walden, J. Wilson)

Singles

Personnel
Shanice – vocals, spoken word, synthesizers
Louis Biancaniello, Eric Daniels, Mike Mani, Claytoven Richardson – keyboards, programming, backing vocals
Vernon "Ice" Black, Corrado Rustici, Ric Wilson – guitars
Joel Smith – bass
Narada Michael Walden – keyboards, synthesizers, programming, drums, percussion
Branford Marsalis – saxophone
Johnny Gill – spoken word
Jarvis La Rue Baker, Kitty Beethoven, Zorana Edun, Nikita Germaine, Sandy Griffith, Chris Hawkins, Skyler Jett, Ellen Keating, Alyssa Lala, Tony Lindsey, Crystal Wilson – backing vocals
String arrangements – Jerry Hey

Charts

Certifications

References

External links 
 

1991 albums
Shanice albums
Albums produced by Narada Michael Walden
Motown albums